Nawab Faizullah Ali Khan (c. 1730 – 17 July 1794) was the first Nawab of Rampur. The princely state of Rampur was set up in year 1774, after the First Rohilla War, by the dismemberment of the Rohilla Kingdom of Rohilkhand. Faizullah Khan, the only surviving heir of Ali Mohammed Khan and opponent of the forces of Awadh and the British East India Company in the war, was installed as ruler of what was the newly created Rampur State. It bordered the Maratha Empire to the south, making it a strategic point. Under tutelage of the East India Company, Faizullah Khan ruled peacefully for 20 years. The capital Rampur was founded, and the Raza Library collection gathered.

Biography
He was the second son of Ali Mohammed Khan, who was a Jat boy of age of eight when he was adopted by the chief of the Barech tribe, Sardar Daud Khan Rohilla. He assumed rule of the Rohillas after his elder brother Nawab Saadullah Khan. He and his brother Nawab Sayyid Saddullah Khan Bahadur Rohilla of Rohilkhand fought with Ahmed Shah Abdali in the Third Battle Of Panipat, and was granted Shikohabad. While his brother was granted Jalesar and Firozabad.

First Rohilla War 
In 1774, during the invasion of Rohilkhand by the united armies of the Vizier Shuja-ud-Daula and the British East India Company, Faizullah Khan led a resistance in which many of the Rohilla's principal chiefs were killed. Escaping from the slaughter, Faizullah Khan made his retreat good towards the mountains, with all his treasure. He collected the scattered remains of his countrymen; and as he was the eldest surviving son of Ali Mohammed Khan, he seems at length to have been generally acknowledged by his natural subjects the undoubted heir of his father's authority. 

Nawab Faizullah Khan with the remaining Rohilla's sought refuge in the forest of the hills of Lal Dang where the war eventually became a war of attrition, after a siege of one month both sides sought peace. Eventually, Shuja ud Daula's plan of realising Hafiz Rehmat Khan's son Mohabbat Khan in order to undermine the authority of Nawab Faizullah Khan, helped bring Faizullah Khan into negotiations. A treaty mediated by Colonel Champion helped resolve the situation, bringing an outcome of desire for both sides. The treaty of Lal Dang allowed Faizullah Khan to choose any area for his future Rohilla State with Faizullah choosing Rampur.

Treaty of Lal Dang 
The Treaty of Lal Dang included the following provisions:

 Faizullah had to reduce his army from 20,000 to 5,000, expelling all other troops to the east of the Ganges 
 Faizullah was to be diplomatically isolated, only being allowed to enter into correspondence with the British East India Company or the Nawab of Awadh.
 Faizullah was to consider the enemies of Awadh as his own and the friends of Awadh as his own. He was further obliged to raise up to 3000 troops in case Awadh went to war. He was additionally required to personally also join the Nawab-Wazir of Awadh if the latter personally led in any war.

This treaty helped serve to bring Rampur into the sphere of British control, as soon with the death of Shuja ud Daula, Asaf ud Daula's accession saw the Nawab of Awadh reduced to a British puppet.

Rampur State 
Faizullah Khan soon saw the precariousness of the situation that he had found himself in, with Awadh reduced to a puppet state his authority was palpably undermined, therefore he immediately sought to have the treaty ratified and legitimised by the Governor General in council of the East India Company. His concerns became particularly worrisome when the British Resident John Bristow threatened to seize his "Jagir".
Desperate, he wrote to the Governor-General in Calcutta that he would be willing to enter into the services of the company if the British insisted on annexing his state. The Governor-General Warren Hastings eventually instructed the Resident at Lucknow, Nathaniel Middleton to ratify the treaty in the company's name, though not before extracting one lakh rupees for the company. Faizullah was not satisfied with the treaty being ratified by the Resident of Lucknow and requested the Governor-General to ratify the treaty himself. This resulted in an angry missive by Middleton who wrote Faizullah, saying:

This sort of argument does little credit to the Khan's usually sound judgment... He knows very well that the Col. Champion had attested the treaty in his private capacity as a witness while the writer has expressly signed it in a representative capacity acting under the orders of the Governor-General in Council.

In this treaty of 1778, Faizullah Khan was able to gain a significant advantage in the ability to retain an excess revenue for himself. However the British were insistent of maximising the military and tributary benefits it derived from Rampur, often in violation of previous treaties. The British especially made use of Rampur's Cavalry, as the region of Rohilkhand was impossible to maintain securely without a highly mobile cavalry. During summer times the region often came under security threat from outlaw Rohillas, Sikhs and Gujars who often carried out lightning raids before returning to their base. British attempts to subvert this were in large part frustrated. The answer came in the form of the highly accomplished Rohilla Cavalry of Rampur.

General Hibbert, commander of British troops in western Awadh in 1774 addresses the Governor General in Council saying: 
 "Like Marathas they (Sikhs and Gujars) are sudden and rapid... it is therefore necessary to oppose them and check their progress at several fords across the Ganges, the Rohilkhand and the Doab, which at this season of the year are very numerous, and as this cannot be affected by a small body of infantry without the assistance of cavalry, I do not think that a part of those which Faizullah Khan has proposed to retain, can be more advantageously employed there for this purpose"

Deployments 
Faizullah Khan sent his forces on several occasions in sight of his commitments to the Lal Dang treaty, these included:
 April 1777 to crush the rebellion of Hafiz Rehmat Khan's son Hurmat Khan in Philibit 
 Anglo-French War of 1778-1783 ,In January 1779, he sent 2000 horse to help the British against the french in South India. 
 February 1779, he sent a force of 700 horse under Muhammad Umar Khan to help Col. Muir's force at Daranagar to repel Sikh raids.

1781 to 1783 proved to be stressful years for Faizullah, the constant strain that the company put him under challenged the existence of the Rampur riyasat. In November 1782, Rampuri Troops that had been used for the personal aggrandisement of British Officers rebelled against the Awadh army, bringing an end to the arrangement. This led to the belief that rampur should be annexed by awadh, a belief previously held by the Nawab of Awadh and endorsed by the Residents of Lucknow, to extend to the Governor General Warren Hastings.

Extortion by the British 
The early 1780s saw great strain upon British coffers, with the First Anglo-Maratha war as well as Haider Ali's wars in Mysore largely depleting company funds. The result meant that the British increased their extortionist policies on their subsidiary allies. Not only did these extend to the Begum's of Awadh and on Chait Singh but also upon Rampur State. Faizullah Khan was now being asked by the British to supply 5000 horse for Col. Muir at Fatehgarh. This well exceeded the 3000 horse requirement held by the Treaty of Lal Dang and additionally shocked the company's Court of Directors at the injustice of the Demand. Faizullah khan replied in 1781 that he could only supply the 2000 Horse, as the rest would be needed to maintain law and order in his own country. Despite Warren Hasting's being well aware that Faizullah Khan only possessed 2000 horse. Hastings nonetheless still demanded 3000 horse, an amount less than the original, but still over the stipulated number that the treaty of Lal Dang had required.

Annexation Plans by the British  
The British went further to make preposterous demands on Faizullah Khan, asking him to personally lead troops even though the Nawab Wazir was not personally leading the army. Richard Johnson, an assistant to the Resident at Lucknow was deputed to Rampur and as can be predicted he highly recommended the annexation of Rampur state based on the multiple alleged violations of the treaty by Faizullah Khan. Johnson alleged that Faizullah Khan kept an army of 20,000 soldiers and kept peasants who had deserted Awadh.

Faizullah Khan finally relented to the immense pressure and agreed to provide 2000 horse along with 1000 infantry, all this would be accompanied with a year's advance in salary to the troops and funding to the British. This did not stop Hastings from going to Awadh on 19 September 1781, and signing a treaty with Asaf ud Daula, called the Treaty of Chunar, where the company gave its assent to the annexation of Rampur by Awadh in lieu of an alleged breach of the Treaty of Lal Dang. Hastings kept the proposed plan of annexation stalled looking for an opportune moment, however his plans were thwarted by the Court of Directors in February 1783, who deemed the annexation illegitimate. Noting that:
 Faizullah Khan's merits with company's on the hand, and the Governor General's treatment of him on the other, must be known to all surrounding powers and if such singular marks of attention of the company's interest and government are thus acquitted we have reason to dread future nominations against us, which may end in the utter extirpation of the English from Hindustan (emphasis added).

Further Extortion by British  
The British continued their pressure of extracting tribute form Rampur, Warren Hastings sent his close friend William Palmer to Faizullah Khan in June 1783. Demanding through Palmer that Faizullah Khan should pay a subsidy for the force of 3000 horse and further reimburse Awadh for the defection of Awadhi peasants to Rampur. Faizullah Khan initially refused, but under further pressure he eventually relented on, paying a lump sum of 15 lakh rupees to the British.

Faizullah Khan astutely dealt with the British, occasionally refusing and occasional completely acquiescing to their demands. His endeavours to prevent war with the company and his efforts to maintain peace in Rampur for over 20 years, allowed him to lay the ground works of power for what would allow Rampur to violently challenge colonial domination in 1794 through the Second Rohilla War.

Religion 
Faizullah Khan was a syed among the pashtuns and his family settled South Asia during the Mughal Empire. The pashtuns consisted of high-ranking soldiers and administrative elites of the Mughal Empire. Rampur State was one of the important Shia princely states with Awadh. Faizullah Khan was Sunni and wanted his son Muhammad Ali Khan to accept the same tradition. However, due to the influence and teaching of Nawab Asaf-ud-Dauala, his eldest son accepted Shia creed.

He was buried in a tomb near Eidgah Darawaza Rampur.

Descendants 
He had 18 children.

From wife Gulzadi Begum Kulan, sister of his brother-in-law Bahadur Khan Kamalzai:
 Nawab Muhammad Ali Khan, eldest son
 Nawab Ghulam Muhammad Khan, son,
 Ajeeb Begum, daughter
 Badshah Begum
From wife Taj Begum of Kamalzai ancestry:
 Syed Hasan Ali Khan, son
 Syed Hussain Ali Khan, son
 Umdah Begum, daughter
 Alahi Khan, daughter
From wife Gulzadi Begum Khird of Kamalzai tribe:
 Syed Nizam Ali Khan, son
 Syed Fatah Ali Khan, son
 Syed Nizam Ali Khan, son
 Syed Qasim Ali Khan, son
 Meena Begum, daughter
 Amani Begum, daughter
From wife Nihayat Begum of Bunerwal ancestry:
 Syed Yaqub Ali Khan, son
 Syed Kareem-ullah Khan, son
 Jani Begum, daughter
 Ajooba khan (aka Bobo), daughter

See also
Kingdom of Rohilkhand

Depictions

Notes

1730 births
1793 deaths
Nawabs of Rampur
Rohilla
History of Uttar Pradesh
Indian people of Pashtun descent